This is a list of locomotives that were used or trialled on the Liverpool and Manchester Railway (L&MR) during its construction, at the Rainhill Trials, and until absorption by the Grand Junction Railway in 1845.

The rate of progress led to quite a rapid turnover in the operating roster.  Writing in 1835, Count de Pambour found that of the L&MR's then thirty engines, ten were seen as obsolete and day-to-day work was concentrated on only ten or eleven of the remainder, the remaining third being under repair or kept as backup.  By 1840 only ten remained of the first 32 engines; and of a list of engines in use in 1844, fewer than half were even five years old.

Locomotives were often also substantially rebuilt.  According to de Pambour again, observing the railway in 1834,
"... what is meant by repairs to the engines is nothing less than their complete re-construction; that is to say that when an engine requires any repair, unless it is for some trifling accident, it is taken to pieces and a new one is constructed, which receives the same name as the first, and in the construction of which are made to serve all such parts of the old engine as are still capable of being used with advantage. The consequence of this is that a reconstructed or repaired engine is literally a new one.  The repairs amount thus to considerable sums, but they include also the renewal of the engines."

Locomotives

† Number allocated but not applied

References

Further reading

 

Williams, Frederick S. (1852/1888). Our Iron Roads.

Grand Junction Railway

Liverpool and Manchester Railway locomotives